Love is a bi-annual British style magazine founded in 2009 by stylist and fashion journalist Katie Grand.  Since 2012, Lulu Kennedy has been editor-at-large and Alex Fury has been editor of this Condé Nast publication.  Suzanne Weinstock of the Columbia University Graduate School of Journalism described the magazine this way in 2010:

Despite its glossy pages, the magazine has a raw look. Black-and-white photography dominates, and most of the color photography has a muted palette, as if the pictures have aged and faded. Some images are clearly fashion photography; others are more like inventive snapshots. Nudity is plentiful in many styles, from the grittily pornographic to the breathtakingly artistic.

The first cover in 2009 featured American singer-songwriter Beth Ditto, naked. Later covers have featured Madonna, Cher, Kate Moss, Miley Cyrus, Lea T, Justin Bieber, and even (for the tenth issue) Minnie Mouse. 

Grand left the magazine in September 2020. She was replaced by Whembley Sewell who announced plans to move the magazine to the United States.

References

External links

 

Magazines established in 2009
Visual arts magazines published in the United Kingdom
Biannual magazines published in the United Kingdom
Magazines published in London
Fashion magazines published in the United Kingdom